U pěti veverek  is a 1944 Czechoslovak comedy film, directed by Miroslav Cikán. It stars  Jaromíra Pacová, Jindřich Plachta, and Růžena Nasková.

References

External links
U pěti veverek  at the Internet Movie Database

1944 films
Czechoslovak comedy films
1944 comedy films
Films directed by Miroslav Cikán
Czechoslovak black-and-white films
1940s Czech films